Granada Undivided High School, known as 'Granada High School, is the high school serving Granada, Colorado, United States. In the 2004–05 school year, the school served 122 students in grades 7–12.

As a school project, students have set up a museum with details about and artifacts from the Granada War Relocation Center. John Hopper, a history teacher at the school, started a program in the early 1990s to educate students about the Japanese American internment camp located near the community during World War II, gathering photos and interviewing those interned at the camps. Through the efforts of students and their Amache Preservation Society, the camp has been designated as a National Historic Landmark. Students from the school have traveled around the state, teaching other students about the internment camp.

Athletics
The Granada High School Bobcats compete in the Arkansas Valley League. The team colors are green and white.

Despite the school's extremely small enrollment, the school's sports teams have earned recognition as state champions in several sports administered by the Colorado High School Activities Association:
 Baseball: 1991 (1A-2A) and 1995 (2A)
 Boys' basketball: 1989 (A-II) and 1991 (1A)
 Girls' basketball: 1996 (1A)
 American football: 1979, 1988 and 2006 (A-8). The Granada High School Bobcats won the 2006 Class A 8-man football state championship in triple overtime with a 47–46 win against Stratton Senior High School, after three previous championship game losses against Stratton.

References

External links
 

Public high schools in Colorado
Schools in Prowers County, Colorado
Public middle schools in Colorado